Gabriel Andrews is an Australian television, film and stage actor. He is best known for the hundreds of roles he played on the popular sketch comedy TV show Comedy Inc.

Career
Born in Sydney, he is a graduate of the National Institute of Dramatic Art. He appeared on G.P., Water Rats, Home and Away, and All Saints, before doing three years on Nine Network's Comedy Inc. He has appeared in several films, including Children and The Time Game. He has performed in many Sydney theatre productions and has done a host of readings, short stories, poems and journals for ABC Radio National, most notably a well-loved reading of Kenneth Cook's Australian classic novel Wake in Fright.

He is also an accomplished singer and violinist. Originally classically trained, he now sings and plays blues/jazz.

Due to his early beginnings as a professional musician and actor, he was fortunate enough to have had the privilege of performing on all four stages of the Sydney Opera House (Concert Hall, Opera Theatre, Drama Theatre, Playhouse) by the age of seventeen.

Theatre credits
 Broadway Bound by Neil Simon (as Eugene Jerome) Marian St Theatre
 Gabriel by Moira Buffini (as Gabriel) New Theatre
 Crimes of the Heart by Beth Henley (as Barnett Lloyd) Marian St Theatre
 Arcadia by Tom Stoppard (as Gus/Lord Augustus) directed by Gale Edwards Australia-wide tour Sydney Theatre Company
 Daylight Saving by Nick Enright (as Jason Strutt)  Marian St Theatre
 The Winslow Boy by Terence Rattigan (as Ronnie Winslow) Playhouse, Sydney Opera House
 Great Expectations the musical (as Young Pip) Seymour Centre

Television credits
 Comedy Inc. (as hundreds of characters) Nine Network
 Home and Away (as Angus Halliday) Seven Network
 Water Rats (as Luke) Nine Network
 Water Rats (as Rowan) Nine Network
 G.P. (as Jimmy) ABC
 All Saints (as Lachlan) Seven Network

Film credits
 The Time Game (as Tony Johnson)
 Children (as Claude Phillips)
 Things Wong Kar-Wai Taught Me About Love (as Gabriel)

References

External links
 Gabriel Andrews -official website
 

Australian male stage actors
Australian male film actors
Australian male television actors
Living people
Year of birth missing (living people)